AnimeFest is an annual four-day anime convention held during August at the Sheraton Dallas Hotel in Dallas, Texas.

Programming
The convention typically offers autograph sessions, cosplay contests, and a masquerade.

History
In 2012, the convention moved from the Hyatt Regency Dallas to the Sheraton Dallas Downtown Hotel. A-Kon also used the same hotel in 2012. AnimeFest in 2017 had issues with its autograph lines. AnimeFest 2020 was cancelled due to the COVID-19 pandemic. AnimeFest 2021 was initially cancelled due to the COVID-19 pandemic and an online event held in its place. The convention would later hold an event in December 2021.

Event history

References

External links
AnimeFest Website

Anime conventions in the United States
Recurring events established in 1992
1992 establishments in Texas
Annual events in Texas
Conventions in Texas
Japanese-American culture in Texas
Festivals in Dallas
Tourist attractions in Dallas